Samson Tuliapus  is an Anglican bishop in Kenya: he has been the Suffragan Bishop of Kapenguria in the Anglican Diocese of Kitale since 2017.

Notes

21st-century Anglican bishops of the Anglican Church of Kenya
Suffragan bishops
Year of birth missing (living people)
Living people
Anglican bishops of Kapenguria